Goniobranchus galactos is a species of colourful sea slug, a dorid nudibranch, a marine gastropod mollusc in the family Chromodorididae.

Distribution
This species is only known from Enewetak Atoll, Marshall Islands.

Description
Goniobranchus galactos is a chromodorid nudibranch with a white mantle, white gills and rhinophores. It has an orange band at the edge of the mantle and a distinctive submarginal band of purple with small opaque white spots scattered densely on this.

References

Chromodorididae
Gastropods described in 1985